Ornithogalum narbonense, common names Narbonne star-of-Bethlehem, pyramidal star-of-Bethlehem and southern star-of-Bethlehem, is a herbaceous perennial flowering plant with underground bulbs, belonging to the genus Ornithogalum of the family Asparagaceae. The Latin name Ornithogalum of the genus, meaning "bird's milk", derives from the Greek, while the species name narbonense refers to the French town of Narbonne.

Description
The bulbs are whitish and ovoid. The raceme is pyramidal, with 25-75 hermaphrodite flowers. The flowers are pollinated by insects. The flowering period extends from May through June.

Gallery

Distribution
This species is present in the Mediterranean Basin, Armenia and northwestern Iran.

Habitat
This plant grows in fields and grassy and dry areas, in waste ground and in rocky terrains.

References

 Pignatti S. - Flora d'Italia - Edagricole – 1982 Vol. III, pg. 372

External links
 Malta Wild Plants
 Biolib
 Ornithogalum narbonense

narbonense